Simiskina pasira is a butterfly in the family Lycaenidae. It is found in southern Burma, Thailand and on Peninsular Malaysia, Langkawi, Mindanao and Borneo.

Subspecies
Simiskina pasira pasira
Simiskina pasira semperi (Fruhstorfer 1919) (Philippines: Mindanao)

References

External links
, 1940. A revision of the Malayan species of Poritiinae (Lepidoptera: Lycaenidae). Trans. R. ent. Soc. Lond. 90: 337-350, 1 pl., 21 figs.
, 1912. A list of the butterflies of Borneo with descriptions of new species (3). J. Straits Brch. R. asiat. Soc. 6: 73-177. pl. 8.
, 1991. Butterflies of Borneo Vol. 2, No. 1. Lycaenidae. Tobishima Corporation, Tokyo.

Butterflies described in 1895
Simiskina
Butterflies of Borneo
Butterflies of Asia